Virginia's 27th Senate district is one of 40 districts in the Senate of Virginia. It has been represented by Republican Jill Vogel since 2008.

Geography
District 27 is located in the northern Shenandoah Valley and far western D.C. metropolitan area, covering all of Clarke County, Frederick County, Fauquier County, and the City of Winchester, as well as parts of Culpeper County, Loudoun County, and Stafford County.

The district overlaps with Virginia's 1st, 5th, 7th, and 10th congressional districts, and the 2nd, 10th, 18th, 29th, 31st, 33rd, and 88th districts of the Virginia House of Delegates. It borders the state of West Virginia.

Recent election results

2019

2015

2011

Federal and statewide results in District 27

Historical results
All election results below took place prior to 2011 redistricting, and thus were under different district lines.

Prior to 2011 redistricting, the district had consisted of Clark County, Fauquier County, Frederick County, Loudoun County, and Winchester.

2007

2003

1999

1995

References

Virginia Senate districts
Clarke County, Virginia
Culpeper County, Virginia
Fauquier County, Virginia
Frederick County, Virginia
Government in Loudoun County, Virginia
Stafford County, Virginia
Winchester, Virginia